Benny Michael Mårtensson nicknamed Benny Goldfoot is a former Swedish professional footballer playing as a striker and coach. He is best known for being Trelleborgs FF's all-time most-capped player at 497 appearances and top scorer with 290 goals, a record he achieved between 1973 and 1990, and is considered their all-time greatest player.

References

1957 births
Living people
Swedish footballers
Association football forwards